Somer (also de Somer, van Somer) is a surname, and may refer to:

 Avo Sõmer (born 1934), American musicologist, music theorist and composer
 Eli Somer (born 1951), Israeli professor of clinical psychology
 Gerard Somer (born 1943), Dutch football player and manager
 Hendrick de Somer (1602–c.1655), Flemish painter
 Henry Somer (c.1370–1450), English courtier and politician
 Iryna Somer (born 1970), Ukrainian journalist
 John Somer (died 1573), English cleric
 John Somer (footballer) (1891–1939), Australian rules footballer
 Mehmet Murat Somer (born 1959), Turkish author of crime fiction
 Paul van Somer I (c.1577–1621), Flemish artist
 Pieter De Somer (1917–1985), Belgian physician and biologist
 Tarık Galip Somer (1926–1997), Turkish academic 
 Yanti Somer (born 1948), Finnish actress

See also
 Somers (surname)